Ángel Acebes Paniagua (born 3 July 1958) is a Spanish politician.

Early life and education
Acebes holds a degree in law from the University of Salamanca.

Political career
Acebes has been a member of parliament for the right-wing People's Party since 1996, representing Avila. He played a key role in securing the support of minority parties and so making it possible for the People's Party to form a government.

Acebes served as Minister of Justice from 1999-2002 and Interior Minister from 2002-04. He was Interior Minister - responsible for national security and Police - when the Madrid bombings occurred and was criticised by his opponents for blaming the attacks on ETA, allegedly for electoral gain, rather than on Islamic militants.

Life after politics
In 2012, Spain’s high court accepted a case brought by UPyD against Acebes and several executives at Bankia and its parent BFA, which will seek to examine whether its accounts were misrepresented and investors misled about the lender’s 2011 stock market listing. In October 2014, he had to appear in the High Court over allegations the PP ran a slush fund.

Other activities
 Iberdrola, Independent Member of the Board of Directors (since 2020)

References

External links

People's Party Website 

1958 births
Living people
People from the Province of Ávila
Members of the 6th Congress of Deputies (Spain)
Members of the 7th Congress of Deputies (Spain)
Members of the 8th Congress of Deputies (Spain)
Members of the 9th Congress of Deputies (Spain)
University of Salamanca alumni
People's Party (Spain) politicians
Justice ministers of Spain
Members of the Senate of Spain
Interior ministers of Spain
Mayors of places in Castile and León